Joseph Abraham Gottlieb (February 3, 1918 – October 17, 2007), known professionally as Joey Bishop, was an American entertainer who appeared on television as early as 1948 and eventually starred in his own weekly comedy series playing a talk/variety show host, then later hosted a late-night talk show with Regis Philbin as his young sidekick on ABC.  He also was a member of the "Rat Pack" with Frank Sinatra, Dean Martin, Sammy Davis Jr. and Peter Lawford.  He is listed as 96th entry on Comedy Central's list of 100 greatest comedians.

Early life and education 
Bishop, the youngest of five children, was born in the Bronx, New York City, the son of Polish-Jewish immigrants Anna (née Siegel) and Jacob Gottlieb. His father was a bicycle repairman. Bishop was raised in South Philadelphia, Pennsylvania.

Bishop was drafted into the US Army during World War II, and he rose to the rank of sergeant in the Special Services, serving at Fort Sam Houston in Texas.

Career 

Bishop began his career as part of a stand-up comedy act with his elder brother, Maury. He  appeared on The Ed Sullivan Show on May 28, 1950, The Dinah Shore Chevy Show on April 19, 1957, and many other variety programs in the early days of television. He guest-hosted The Tonight Show substituting for Jack Paar, and then guest-hosted The Tonight Show Starring Johnny Carson at least 175 times in the 1960s, and from 1971 to 1976 more than anyone else until that time (Jay Leno and Joan Rivers later surpassed his record).  He also frequently appeared on Steve Allen's and Jack Paar's previous versions of The Tonight Show. He later had his own late-night show.

Bishop starred in the situation comedy The Joey Bishop Show that premiered on September 20, 1961, and ran for 123 episodes over four seasons, first on NBC and later CBS. Bishop played Joey Barnes, at first a publicity agent and then later a talk show host.  Abby Dalton joined the cast in 1962 as his wife.

Bishop later hosted a 90-minute late-night talk show, also titled The Joey Bishop Show, that was launched by ABC on April 17, 1967, as competition to Carson's Tonight Show and ran until December 26, 1969. His sidekick was then-newcomer Regis Philbin.

Bishop was among the stars of the original Ocean's 11 film about military veterans who reunite in a plot to rob five Las Vegas casinos on New Year's Eve. He co-starred with Frank Sinatra, Dean Martin, Sammy Davis Jr., and Peter Lawford, also known as the Rat Pack, although the five of them did not publicly acknowledge that name. 

During filming, the five entertainers performed together onstage in Vegas at the Sands Hotel. Bishop did only a little singing and dancing, but he told jokes and wrote most of the act's material. He later appeared with Sinatra, Martin, Davis, and Lawford in the military adventure Sergeants 3 (1962), a loose remake of Gunga Din (1939), and with Martin in the Western comedy Texas Across the River (1966), in which he portrayed an American Indian.

Bishop was the only member of the Rat Pack to work with members of a younger group of actors dubbed the Brat Pack, appearing (as a ghost) in the film Betsy's Wedding (1990) with Molly Ringwald and Ally Sheedy. His final appearance in a film was a non-speaking role in Mad Dog Time (1996), written and directed by his son, Larry. His character was named Gottlieb, which was his real surname. The film was panned by critics.

Bishop was portrayed by Bobby Slayton in the HBO film The Rat Pack (1998).

Personal life and final years 
Bishop wed Sylvia Ruzga in 1941, and they were married for 58 years until her death from lung cancer in 1999. They had one son, Larry Bishop, a film director and actor.

Thereafter, Bishop had a longtime companion, Nora Garibotti. In failing health for some time, Bishop died at age 89 of multiple organ failure on October 17, 2007, in his home on Lido Isle, a man-made island in the harbor of Newport Beach, California, as the last surviving Rat Pack member. Per Bishop's wishes, his remains were cremated and scattered in the Pacific Ocean near his home. He had two grandsons, Kirk and Scott.

The Broadcast Pioneers of Philadelphia posthumously inducted Bishop into their Hall of Fame in 2009.

Filmography 

The Deep Six (1958) as Ski Krokowski
The Naked and the Dead (1958) as Roth
Onionhead (1958) as Sidney Gutsell
Ocean's 11 (1960) as Mushy' O'Connors
Pepe (1960) as Joey Bishop (Cameo)
Sergeants 3 (1962) as Sgt.-Maj. Roger Boswell
Johnny Cool (1963) as Holmes – Used Car Salesman
Texas Across the River (1966) as Kronk
A Guide for the Married Man (1967) as Technical Adviser (Charlie)
Who's Minding the Mint? (1967) as Ralph Randazzo
Valley of the Dolls (1967) as MC at Telethon
The Delta Force (1986) as Harry Goldman (Passenger)
Betsy's Wedding (1990) as Mr. Hopper – Eddie's Father
Mad Dog Time (1996) as Mr. Gottlieb (final film role)

Television work 

The Polly Bergen Show (May 3, 1958) (guest star) as himself
Richard Diamond, Private Detective in "No Laughing Matter" (1959) as Joey Kirk
The Frank Sinatra Timex Show: Welcome Home Elvis (May 12, 1960) as himself
What's My Line? (1960–1966) (frequent panelist) as himself
Make Room for Daddy (1961)
The Joey Bishop Show  (1961–1965) situation comedy co-starring Abby Dalton, originally on NBC, then CBS as Joey Barnes / Joey Barnes Jr. / Louie
Password (1961–1967) (frequent guest)
Get Smart (September 23, 1967) (cameo guest) as himself
The Tonight Show Starring Johnny Carson (1962–1992) (frequent guest & substitute host) as himself
The Hollywood Squares (1966–1981) (frequent panelist) as himself
The Joey Bishop Show (1967–1969) late-night 90-minute talk show on ABC
Rowan & Martin's Laugh-In (March 25, 1968/April 29, 1968/January 18, 1971) as himself
Chico and the Man (1976) as Charlie
The Jacksons Variety Show (July 7, 1976) special guest star as himself
Celebrity Sweepstakes (1974–1977) (frequent panelist) as himself
Match Game (1976) as a panelist
Liar's Club (1976–1978) (frequent panelist) as himself
Break the Bank (1976–1977) (frequent panelist) as himself
Murder, She Wrote (1985) as Buster Bailey
Glory Years (1987) as Sydney Rosen

References

External links 

 
 
 
 Broadcast Pioneers of Philadelphia website

1918 births
2007 deaths
Rat Pack
20th-century American comedians
20th-century American male actors
20th-century American male writers
American male film actors
American male screenwriters
American male singer-songwriters
American male television actors
American people of Polish-Jewish descent
American stand-up comedians
American television talk show hosts
Comedians from California
Comedians from New York (state)
Deaths from multiple organ failure
Jewish American comedians
Jewish American male actors
Male actors from Los Angeles
Male actors from Newport Beach, California
Male actors from Philadelphia
People from the Bronx
Screenwriters from California
Screenwriters from New York (state)
Screenwriters from Pennsylvania
United States Army non-commissioned officers
20th-century American screenwriters
20th-century American male singers
20th-century American singers
Singer-songwriters from New York (state)